The  is a commuter and suburban electric multiple unit (EMU) train type developed by East Japan Railway Company (JR East) from the earlier E231 series and the E531 series design. The first train was introduced in December 2006 for use on the Chūō Line (Rapid), followed by the E233-1000 series variant in 2007 for use on the Keihin–Tōhoku and Negishi lines, the E233-3000 series outer-suburban variant in December 2007 for use on the Tōkaidō Main Line, and narrow-bodied E233-2000 series variant for Jōban Line and Tokyo Metro Chiyoda Line through services. Further variants were built for use on the Keiyō Line, Yokohama Line, Saikyō Line, and Nambu Line.

Design
The E233 series features two identical sets of main equipment in case of failure. This is the first JR East stock to feature such backup measures. The E233 series provides for better accessibility for the disabled, and is designed to be more comfortable to ride overall than previous stock. For standing passengers the handle straps have been lowered by  compared to older train models.

This stock also features an air filtration system to remove unpleasant smells. It also features liquid crystal display information screens and automatic announcement system similar to those used on the E231 series rolling stock on the Yamanote Line.

The stock is the first JR East stock to use full-colour LEDs for the destination indicators on the sides of the carriages. This is due to the fact that the Chūō Line has numerous types of services, and colour-coding will help passengers board the correct train.

Variants
  E233-0 series: 4-, 6-, and 10-car sets used on the Chūō Rapid, Ōme, Itsukaichi, Hachikō and Fujikyuko lines since 26 December 2006
  E233-1000 series: 10-car sets used on the Keihin–Tōhoku and Negishi lines since 22 December 2007
  E233-2000 series: 10-car sets used on Jōban Line/Tokyo Metro Chiyoda Line through services since 9 September 2009
  E233-3000 series: 5- and 10-car sets used on Tōkaidō Main Line, Takasaki Line, and Utsunomiya Line outer-suburban services since March 2008, and on Ueno–Tokyo Line and Shōnan–Shinjuku Line through services since March 2015
  E233-5000 series: 4-, 6-, and 10-car sets used on the Keiyō Line since 1 July 2010
  E233-6000 series: 8-car sets used on the Yokohama Line since 16 February 2014
  E233-7000 series: 10-car sets used on the Saikyō Line, Kawagoe Line and Rinkai Line since 30 June 2013, and on Sōtetsu Shin-Yokohama Line and Sōtetsu Main Line services since November 2019
  E233-8000 series: 6-car sets used on the Nambu Line since 4 October 2014
  E233-8500 series: One converted former E233-0 series 6-car set used on the Nambu Line from 2017

E233-0 series

The first E233-0 series train was introduced in December 2006 for use on the Chūō Line (Rapid), Ōme, and Itsukaichi lines, replacing the aging 201 series trains. The fleet of 688 E233-0 series vehicles (10-car x 42, 6-car x 28, 4-car x 25) was delivered by the end of March 2008; 42 ten-car sets (T1-T42), and 15 6+4-car sets (H43-H57) were constructed primarily for use on the Chūō Line (but also on through services to the Ōme, Itsukaichi, Hachikō, and Fujikyuko Lines), while ten four-car sets (Ao458-Ao467) and 13 six-car sets (Ao658-Ao670) were constructed for the Ōme Line and Itsukaichi Line. In March 2008 and April 2015, sets Ao458+Ao658 and Ao459+Ao659 were transferred to the Chūō Line and renumbered H58 and H59 respectively. 

An additional five cars were built at JR East's Niitsu factory in 2009 to replace five cars from six-car set Ao661 which were withdrawn due to accident damage in 2008.

In 2017, six-car set Ao670 was modified to become the E233-8500 series set N36 for use on the Nambu Line alongside the fleet of E233-8000 series sets.

Green Car introduction 
In April 2018, JR East announced plans to add two bilevel Green (first class) cars to 58 ten-car and six-car E233-0 series EMU sets operated on the Chūō Line and through-service trains to the Ōme Line, and to install toilets on these sets ahead of Green car introductions. To compensate for train shortages brought on by toilet installations, a new ten-car set (T71) was delivered from J-TREC's Yokohama facility on 11 June 2020.

The Green cars will be positioned as cars 4 and 5 in the newly formed 12- and 8-car sets. Green car services were initially due for introduction in fiscal 2020, but this was deferred to 2023. On 27 April 2022, JR East announced that Green car introductions would again be postponed until the end of fiscal 2024 or later as a result of the global chip shortage.

The first Green cars, SaRo E233-1 and SaRo E232-1, were delivered from J-TREC's Yokohama facility from 12 July 2022. Test runs of the new Green cars are being conducted as of July 2022, starting with set H57.

Interior

Formations

10-car Chūō Line sets
As of 11 June 2020, 43 ten-car sets (T1-T42 and T71) are based at Toyoda Depot and formed with six motored ("M") cars and four non-powered trailer ("T") cars.

 MoHa E233-200 and MoHa E233-400 cars each have one PS33D single-arm pantograph, and MoHa E233 cars has two PS33D single-arm pantographs (one used as a backup).
 Cars 1 and 10 have a wheelchair space (also car 4 in sets equipped with a toilet).
 Car 4 has a universal design toilet (in sets equipped with a toilet).
 Car 4 is designated as a mildly air-conditioned car.

6+4-car Chūō Line sets
As of 22 March 2020, 17 6+4-car sets (H43-H59) are based at Toyoda Depot and formed with six motored ("M") cars and four non-powered trailer ("T") cars.

 Car 4 has one PS33D single-arm pantograph, and cars 2 and 8 each have two PS33D single-arm pantographs (one used as a backup).
 Cars 1 and 10 have a wheelchair space (also car 4 in sets equipped with a toilet).
 Car 4 has a universal design toilet (in sets equipped with a toilet).
 Car 4 is designated as a mildly air-conditioned car.

6+4-car Ōme Line and Itsukaichi Line sets
As of 1 October 2018, ten six-car sets (Ao660-Ao669) and eight four-car (Ao460-Ao467) sets are based at Toyoda Depot and formed with six motored ("M") cars and four non-powered trailer ("T") cars. Depending on the specific schedule and line, trains are operated in 4-, 6-, or 6+4-car sets.

 Car 4 has one PS33D single-arm pantograph, and cars 2 and 8 each have two PS33D single-arm pantographs (one used as a backup).
 Cars 1 and 10 have a wheelchair space.
 Car 4 is designated as a mildly air-conditioned car.

E233-1000 series

A fleet of 83 ten-car E233 series sets was introduced on the Keihin–Tōhoku and Negishi lines from autumn 2007, replacing the 209 series EMUs previously used from 1993 until 2010. The first set was delivered in August 2007. The main difference over the earlier E233-0 series is the absence of passenger door controls.

The first set entered service on 22 December 2007.

Two cars of set 177, KuHa E233-1077 and SaHa E233-1277, were involved in a derailment in February 2014 and were scrapped in December 2016. The remaining eight cars of set 177 were scrapped in April 2018.

Interior

Formation 
As of April 2018, 82 ten-car sets were based at Saitama depot and formed with six motored ("M") cars and four non-powered trailer ("T") cars.

E233-2000 series

This is a narrow-bodied variant for Jōban Line and Tokyo Metro Chiyoda Line through services, replacing the 203 series and 207-900 series EMUs previously used. The first ten-car set was delivered to Matsudo Depot from Tokyu Car Corporation in May 2009. It entered service on 9 September 2009.
These trains have also been used on through services on Odakyu lines since 2016. In 2017 the last set was delivered (set number 19 built by J-TREC). Like all trains running into the Tokyo Subway, these trains are fitted with emergency doors in the driver's cabin to allow for the evacuation of passengers in the Chiyoda Line's tunnels.

Interior

Formation
, the fleet consists of 19 ten-car sets, numbered 1 to 19, based at Matsudo Depot, and formed as shown below, with car 1 at the southern end.

Cars 3 and 9 are equipped with one single-arm pantograph. Car 6 is equipped with two.

Build details
The delivery dates for the fleet are as shown below.

E233-3000 series

The E233-3000 sub-series are outer-suburban sets formed as ten-car sets containing two bilevel Green (first-class) cars and five-car sets. Sets are allocated to Kōzu and Oyama depots for use on Tōkaidō Main Line services between Tokyo and Numazu, as well as Shōnan–Shinjuku Line and Ueno–Tokyo Line through services to and from the Takasaki Line and Utsunomiya Line. The first sets entered service on 10 March 2008, and were introduced to the Shōnan–Shinjuku Line from the start of the new timetable on 14 March 2015.

Exterior

Formations

Early 10-car sets
, 2 ten-car sets (E-01 and E-02) are based at Kōzu depot in Kanagawa Prefecture and formed as shown below with six motored ("M") cars and four non-powered trailer ("T") cars.

 Cars 3 and 9 each have one single-arm pantograph, and car 7 has two (one used as a backup).
 Cars 1 and 10 have a wheelchair space.
 Cars 1, 5, and 10 each have a toilet (universal design in cars 1 and 10).
 Car 8 is designated as a mildly air-conditioned car.
 Cars 4 and 5 are bilevel Green Cars.

Standard 10-car sets
, 15 ten-car sets (E-03 to E-17) are based at Kōzu depot in Kanagawa Prefecture and 16 ten-car sets (U618 to U633) are based at Oyama depot in Tochigi Prefecture. They are formed as shown below with six motored ("M") cars and four non-powered trailer ("T") cars.

 Cars 7 and 9 each have one single-arm pantograph, and car 3 has two (one used as a backup).
 Cars 1 and 10 have a wheelchair space.
 Cars 1, 5, 6, and 10 each have a toilet (universal design in cars 1 and 10).
 Car 8 is designated as a mildly air-conditioned car.
 Cars 4 and 5 are bilevel Green Cars.

5-car sets
, 21 five-car sets (E-51 to E-67, E-71 to E-74) are based at Kōzu depot in Kanagawa Prefecture and 18 five-car sets (U218 to U235) are based at Oyama depot in Tochigi Prefecture. They are formed as shown below with two motored ("M") cars and three non-powered trailer ("T") cars.

 Car 13 has two single-arm pantographs (one used as a backup).
 Cars 11 and 15 have a wheelchair space.
 Car 11 has a universal design toilet.

Interior
Standard-class cars have longitudinal seating with dark blue moquette seat covers. Cars 1, 2, 9, 10, 14, and 15 include transverse four-person seating bays. The two Green (first class) bilevel cars (cars 4 and 5) have rotating, reclining seats arranged 2+2 abreast. Seats on the lower deck and end saloons have crimson moquette seat covers, and seats on the upper deck have dark blue moquette.

The first 10+5-car E233-3000 series outer suburban set (E01 + E51) for use on the Tōkaidō Main Line was delivered from the Tokyu Car factory in Yokohama to Kōzu Depot in November 2007. This includes two bilevel Green cars. It entered revenue service on 10 March 2008, and was initially limited to use on the Tōkaidō Main Line between Tokyo and Atami. The second set (10+5-car set E02 + E52) was delivered in February 2010.

Subsequent sets (originally numbered NT1 + NT51 onward) were delivered to Tamachi Depot from September 2011, entering service from 12 November 2011. These sets incorporate a number of minor changes, including moving the second reserve pantograph from car 7 to car 3, and the addition of a toilet in car 6.

Takasaki-based ten- and five-car sets were introduced on Takasaki Line services between Ueno and Maebashi, replacing 211 series sets, and on Ryōmō Line services from 1 September 2012.

E233-5000 series

These are 10-car and 4+6-car sets for use on the Keiyō Line. The fleet consists of 20 ten-car sets and four 4+6-car sets, with the first sets entering revenue service on 1 July 2010, replacing the 201 series, 205 series, and E331 series EMUs previously used.

The first E233-5000 series set, set 501, was delivered from JR East's Niitsu factory on 10 March 2010.

Formations

10-car sets
, 20 ten-car sets are based at Keiyō Depot and formed with six motored ("M") cars and four non-powered trailer ("T") cars.

 Cars 3 and 9 each have one PS33D single-arm pantograph, and car 5 has two PS33D single-arm pantographs (one used as a backup).
 Cars 1 and 10 have a wheelchair space.
 Car 4 is designated as a mildly air-conditioned car.

6+4-car sets
, four 6+4-car sets are based at Keiyō Depot and formed with six motored ("M") cars and four non-powered trailer ("T") cars.

 Car 3 has one PS33D single-arm pantograph, and cars 5 and 9 each have two PS33D single-arm pantographs (one used as a backup).
 Cars 1 and 10 have a wheelchair space.
 Car 4 is designated as a mildly air-conditioned car.

Interior

E233-6000 series

These are eight-car sets operated in the Yokohama Line since 16 February 2014. As with the earlier Saikyo Line E233-7000 series variant, the trains use LED interior lighting.

A total of 28 sets were delivered. The first E233-6000 series set, H016, was delivered from the J-TREC Yokohama factory in January 2014. The first set built at the J-TREC Niitsu factory, set H001, was delivered on 22 January 2014.

Interior
Each car has priority seating at one end, and cars 1 and 8 have a wheelchair space.

Formation
As of September 2014, 28 8-car sets are based at Kamakura depot are formed with four motored ("M") cars and four non-powered trailer ("T") cars.

Car 4 has two single-arm PS33D pantographs (one reserve), and car 7 has one.

Build details
The build details for the fleet are as shown below.

E233-7000 series

A total of 31 ten-car sets were delivered, displacing the fleet of 205 series EMUs previously used. These trains are the first E233 series variant to use LED interior lighting.

An additional seven more sets were delivered in 2019, in preparation for through running services between the Saikyō Line and the Sōtetsu Main Line via the newly built Sōtetsu Shin-Yokohama Line, bringing the total number of trains up to 38 ten-car sets. They began use on Sōtetsu Line services on 30 November 2019.

Interior

Formation
As of 1 January 2020, all 38 ten-car sets are based at Kawagoe Depot and formed with six motored ("M") cars and four non-powered trailer ("T") cars.

 Cars 3 and 9 each have one PS33D single-arm pantograph, and car 5 has two PS33D single-arm pantographs (one is only used as a backup, the other gets normal use).
 Cars 1 and 10 have a wheelchair space.
 Car 9 is designated as a mildly air-conditioned car.

History
The first E233-7000 series set (number 101) was delivered to Kawagoe Depot from JR East's Niitsu factory on 9 April 2013. The first set built by J-TREC (set number 122) was delivered from the manufacturer's Yokohama factory in July 2013.

E233-8000 series

A total of 35 E233-8000 series sets (210 vehicles) are on order, displacing the previous fleet of 205 series and older 209 series EMUs.

Interior
Passenger accommodation consists of longitudinal bench seating throughout, with wheelchair spaces in cars 1 and 6. As with the earlier Yokohama Line E233-6000 series and Saikyo Line E233-7000 series variants, the trains use LED interior lighting.

Formation
As of 2015, 35 six-car sets are based at Nakahara depot and formed with four motored ("M") cars and two non-powered trailer ("Tc") cars.

Notes

 Car 4 has one PS33D single-arm pantograph, and car 2 has two single-arm pantographs (one used as a backup).
 Cars 1 and 6 have a wheelchair space.
 Car 4 is designated as a mildly air-conditioned car.

History
The first set, N1 was delivered from the J-TREC factory in Niitsu in August 2014. It entered revenue service from 4 October 2014.

Build details
The delivery dates for the fleet are as shown below.

E233-8500 series

In 2017, six-car Itsukaichi Line/Ōme Line set Ao670 was modified and renumbered at Omiya Works to become the sole E233-8500 series set N36 for use on the Nambu Line alongside the fleet of E233-8000 series sets and replacing the last remaining 209 series EMU still in use there. In addition to receiving the Nambu Line livery carried by the E233-8000 series fleet, modifications included adding a WiMAX antenna and replacing the original 15-inch LCD passenger display screens with 17-inch screens. Set N36 entered service on the Nambu Line on 15 March 2017.

Formation
As of March 2017, 1 six-car set is based at Nakahara depot and formed with four motored ("M") cars and two non-powered trailer ("Tc") cars.

 Car 4 has one PS33D single-arm pantograph, and car 2 has two single-arm pantographs (one used as a backup).
 Car 1 has a wheelchair space.
 Car 4 is designated as a mildly air-conditioned car.

Accidents
Keihin–Tōhoku Line E233-1000 series set 177 was derailed in a collision with a track maintenance vehicle in the early hours of 23 February 2014 near Kawasaki Station while on an empty stock train operating from Sakuragicho to Kamata. The first two cars of the ten-car train derailed, with the first car ending up on its side. The train was carrying no passengers, and the driver and conductor escaped with minor injuries. The two derailed cars from the set involved, KuHa E233-1077 and SaHa E233-1277, were formally withdrawn in December 2016.

E233 series derivatives

Export 

 PNR EM10000 class, a Philippine standard gauge commuter where the body of this class is derived from.

Local 
 E129 series, an E233 series derivative for use on local services in the Niigata area
 Odakyu 4000 series, an E233-2000 series derivative
 Sotetsu 11000 series, an E233 series derivative
 Toei 10-300 series, an E233 series derivative (Batches 3 onwards)

Notes

References

Further reading

External links

 Chūō Line press release 
 Keihin–Tōhoku Line press release 
 Jōban Line press release 

Electric multiple units of Japan
East Japan Railway Company
Train-related introductions in 2006
J-TREC multiple units
Kawasaki multiple units
1500 V DC multiple units of Japan
Tokyu Car multiple units